Jang Ha-na (born 2 May 1992), also known as Ha Na Jang, is a South Korean professional golfer.

Jang plays on the LPGA of Korea Tour where she has 15 wins and led the money list in 2013. From 2015 through 2017, she played on the LPGA Tour where she won her first LPGA event in February 2016 at the Coates Golf Championship. She currently has endorsement deals with BC Card, Honma Golf, Lee Dong Soo Sport and Kumho Tires.

The week prior to her LPGA Tour win, Jang became the first LPGA Tour golfer to hit a hole-in-one on a par-4. This occurred at the 8th hole during the third round of the Pure Silk-Bahamas LPGA Classic at the Ocean Club.

In May 2017, Jang rescinded her LPGA Tour membership and returned to the LPGA of Korea Tour.

Professional wins (19)

LPGA Tour wins (5)

1 Co-sanctioned with KLPGA Tour

LPGA Tour playoff record (1–1)

LPGA of Korea Tour wins (15)

1 Co-sanctioned with LPGA Tour 
Tournaments in bold are LPGA of Korea Tour majors.

Results in LPGA majors
Results not in chronological order before 2018.

^ The Evian Championship was added as a major in 2013.

CUT = missed the half-way cut
"T" = tied for place

Summary

Most consecutive cuts made – 8 (2016 ANA – 2018 ANA, current)
Longest streak of top-10s – 1 (twice)

References

External links

Jang Ha-na at the KLPGA Tour official site 

Profile on Seoul Sisters site

South Korean female golfers
LPGA of Korea Tour golfers
LPGA Tour golfers
Golfers from San Diego
Golfers from Seoul
1992 births
Living people